Edith Angélica Mellado Céspedes (born 7 June 1938) is a Peruvian former Fujimorist politician and educator.

Biography
Edith Mellado Céspedes was born on 7 June 1938 in Huancayo, Peru. She attended the local Maria Auxiliadora School through her primary and secondary education, and was awarded by the school for an excellent academic career as top of her class for five years. She studied mathematics and mathematical education at the National University of San Marcos and would complete her doctorate at the university. She would take postgraduate studies at the National University of Engineering (Peru), University of Chile, and the University of Murcia in Spain.

Mellado was the first rector of the Los Andes Peruvian University in her home town, Huancayo. She has also been the vice-rector of the National University of the Center of Peru. In 1990, she was a professor emeritus at the same school.

She has also worked at educational institutions like the Colegio Mariscal Castilla, Colegio Nuestra Señora de Cocharcas, and the Escuela Normal Superior "La Asunción" of Huancayo.

Politics
From 1997 to 1998, Mellado was Vice President of the Congress of the Republic of Peru during the government of Alberto Fujimori, representing the Cambio 90 party.

Citations

1938 births
Living people
Members of the Democratic Constituent Congress
Members of the Congress of the Republic of Peru
Fujimorista politicians
People from Huancayo
University of Murcia alumni
National University of San Marcos alumni
National University of Engineering alumni
Women members of the Congress of the Republic of Peru